Needle Island is a pinnacle rock lying 0.2 nautical miles (0.4 km) west of the north end of McDonald Island in the McDonald Islands. Surveyed and given this descriptive name by ANARE (Australian National Antarctic Research Expeditions) in 1948.

See also 
 List of antarctic and sub-antarctic islands

Landforms of Heard Island and McDonald Islands
Rock formations of Antarctica